The 2014 Peterborough City Council election took place on 22 May 2014 to elect members of Peterborough City Council in England. This was on the same day as other local elections.

The Conservatives lost four seats to give them a total of 28 seats, Labour gained one seat to give them a total of 12 seats, UK Independence Party won three seats, the Independents maintained seven seats, the Liberal Democrats maintained four seats and the Liberal Party maintained three seats.

Election result

Ward results

Bretton North

Central

Dogsthorpe

East

Eye and Thorney

Fletton and Woodston

Glinton and Wittering

Newborough

North

Orton Longueville

Orton Waterville

Orton with Hampton

Park

Paston

Stanground Central

Walton

Werrington North

Werrington South

West

References

2014 English local elections
2014
2010s in Cambridgeshire
May 2014 events in the United Kingdom